Gustav Born may refer to:

 Gustav Jacob Born (1851–1900), German histologist and author
 Gustav Victor Rudolf Born (1921–2018), German-British professor of pharmacology